A Year-End Medley ( lit.: Happy New Year) is a 2021 South Korean romantic comedy film directed by Kwak Jae-yong and features an ensemble cast led by Han Ji-min, Lee Dong-wook, Kang Ha-neul and Im Yoon-ah. The film depicts the story of clients who visit the hotel 'Emross' with their own stories as they make their own relations in their own style. It was released simultaneously in theatres and via streaming media TVING on 29 December 2021.

On January 21, 2022, it was announced that due to its popularity, the film will be released as a new six-part extended version of 30 minutes each. All six episodes will be released on TV on January 26, 2022.

Synopsis
 Happy New Year is a feel-good romantic comedy of a young man and woman that is told in the background of hotel 'Emross'. It has stories of people who met each other at Hotel Emross during the New Year holidays.  Each one has his own memory to relate and create relationship or just going nostalgic.

Cast
 Han Ji-min as So Jin, Emross hotel manager who has been hesitant to confess to a 'boyfriend' for 15 years
 Lee Dong-wook as Yong Jin, CEO of hotel 
 Kang Ha-neul as Jae Yong, a guest
 Im Yoon-ah as Soo Yeon, hotel staff
 Won Jin-ah as Lee Young, a musical actress who works as a hotel room maid
 Lee Hye-young as Catherine, a Korean businesswoman returning to Korea to attend her daughter's wedding, she meets a doorman at the hotel 'Emross', and recalls the memories of her first love 40 years ago
 Jung Jin-young as Sang Gyu, doorman at hotel 'Emross' and first love of Catherine
 Kim Young-kwang as Seung Hyo, a radio producer
 Seo Kang-joon as Lee Kang, a singer-songwriter and radio DJ
 Lee Kwang-soo as Sang Hoon, manager of an unknown artist who becomes a hit as a singer and popular DJ
 Ko Sung-hee as Young Joo, a jazz pianist
 Lee Jin-wook as Jin Ho, a plastic surgeon waiting for his true love, he comes to hotel every Saturday to find prospective marriage partner
 Cho Jun-young as Park Se-jik, a high school swimmer who has a secret crush on Lim Ah-yeong
 Won Ji-an as Lim Ah-yeong, a figure skater
 Baek Eun-hye as manager of the hotel 'Emross' maid team
 Lee Joong-ok as Executive director
 Bae Hae-sun as Jung Mi-sook
 Oh Min-ae as Sang-gyu's wife
 Kim Soo-gyeom as Lee Chul-min, a high school student full of intelligence and loyalty and close friend of Park Se-jik 
 Lee Kyu-hyung as a historian (special appearance)

Production

Casting
On April 22, 2021 CJ ENM and TVING announced that the film Happy New Year would be directed by Kwak Jae-yong and confirmed the cast as: Han Ji-min, Lee Dong-wook, Kang Ha-neul, Im Yoon-ah, Won Jin-ah, Seo Kang-jun, Lee Kwang-soo, Kim Young-kwang, Ko Sung-hee, Lee Jin-wook, Lee Kyu-hyung, Jo Jun-young, Won Ji-an and Lee Hye-young and Jung Jin-young.

Filming
Principal photography of the film began on April 19, 2021.

Reception

Box office
The film was released on 832 screens on December 29, 2021. As per Korean Film Council (Kofic) integrated computer network, the film ranked third on the Korean box office with 207,379 cumulative admissions in the opening week. It ranked 3rd at the overall box office and 1st at the box office for Korean films in the opening week of its release.

 it is at 3rd place in the list of Korean films released in the year 2022, with combined gross of US$1.81 million and 230,785 admissions for both years.

Critical response
Jo Yeon-kyung reviewing for JTBC rated it with 2.5 out of 5 on popcorn index and stated that running time of the film was short as it had many stories. She appreciated the performances of ensemble and especially praised Kang Ha-neul and Lee Kwang-soo saying, "[they] showed off their outstanding abilities". Concluding review Jo opined that the it was not a superhero film and genre was not refreshing, still "the pleasant warmth is not pushed away." And Jo ended it writing, "In the cinematic ending of finding each person's relationship, the original growth that makes me fall in love is also a healing message conveyed by Happy New Year." Park Jae-hwan of KBS Entertainment wrote, "It is a spectacle love story in which the 14 main characters unfold at least 7 romances." Concluding Park stated, "This movie is a kind of film that asks you to spend the new year warmly with your family or with someone who will become your family. It is happy to see it in the theater and happy to see it on TV. Anyway, “Happy New Year~”".

References

External links
 
 
 
 
 

CJ Entertainment films
2020s Korean-language films
South Korean romantic comedy-drama films
South Korean Christmas films
Films directed by Kwak Jae-yong
Films set around New Year
Films set in 2021
Films set in 2022
Films set in hotels
Films set in Seoul
TVING original films